Alfred Choubrac (Paris, 30 December 1853 – Paris, 25 July 1902) was a French painter, illustrator, draughtsman, poster artist and costume designer. Together with Jules Chéret he is considered to be one of the pioneers of the modern coloured and illustrated poster of the Belle Époque in France, in particular in Paris.

Early life
Alfred Choubrac was born in Montmartre (Paris). With his elder brother Léon Choubrac (1847–1885), Alfred was trained as a classical artist at the École des Beaux Arts by the painters Charles Doërr and Isidore Pils. The Choubrac brothers began making posters very early in their career; from 1875, they applied modern colour and typographic techniques, combined with graphics, using chromolithography.

In the early 1870s, the Choubrac brothers and Jules Chéret (known as "the father of the modern poster") reduced the cost of colour lithography introducing technical advances. Additionally, in 1881 restrictions on bill-posting (affichage) were lifted and eased state control of the media in France. In 1884, the Paris city council started to rent out space belonging to the municipality, paving the way for a rapid increase in the production and distribution of advertising posters. Posters with clear colours and dashing images appeared all over town during the vibrant spirit of the Belle Époque.

Ateliers Choubrac
The Choubracs worked mainly with the printing company F. Appel. Later, Léon and Alfred created the Ateliers Choubrac, one of the first graphic design agencies in Paris, originally hosted by the printing press G. Massias at the 17 passage Daudin, using a lithographic press. Around 1898, the name of the Atelier was associated with the name of Imprimerie Bourgerie & Cie, at 83 rue du Faubourg, St Denis in Paris. Although his brother Leon died young, Alfred went on to produce an impressive number of posters for Parisian entertainers, theatres, businesses and various commercial products.

Alfred Choubrac specialized in posters for shows in the Parisian night-life scene of the Belle Époque, for theatres such as the Théâtre des Variétés, Théâtre du Châtelet, Folies Bergère, Opéra comique, Moulin rouge, Casino de Paris, the Eldorado, the Circus Fernando. Along with Chéret and Toulouse-Lautrec, amongst others, Choubrac was among the most important poster artist of his time. His most famous poster is Au Joyeux Moulin Rouge to promote the famous nightclub.

Censored

The 1880s and 1890s were an intermediary period in the development of the poster in which its primary political function shifted to a primarily promotional one as advertising in the emerging consumer economy, often, if not primarily, through the commoditisation of female sexuality. In April 1891, under orders from the Minister of the Interior, the prefect of Paris, Henri-Auguste Lozé, seized and destroyed hundreds of posters considered to be a violation of public decency. Many artists and their printers were charged. Several of Choubrac's posters were prohibited and he was brought to court along with the printers.

One of the censored posters advertised the performance of the dancer Ilka de Mynn at the Folies Bergère, who was depicted in a maillot (body stocking), which, according to the court that charged Choubrac was a cause for concern because the model appeared to be nude. Another poster was an advertisement for the French magazine Fin de Siècle, which showed a scarcely dressed female dancer. In an interview with La Presse, Choubrac said he was astonished by the upheaval, claiming that "nudity is exposed everywhere and in much more provocative ways; and I frankly confess that I do not see where the evil was, I sought to make a work of art and nothing more."

Other work and exhibitions
In later life he became also known for his designs of stage costumes for the theatre. Choubrac illustrated several books of the novelist Emile Zola. He produced a number of posters for bookstores to promote popular works. He also produced commercial posters for brands such as the Muscovite Digestive, Humber Cycles, Beeston Tire, Naigeon Gold Water, Unbreakable Baleinine Corsets, Mokatine, Decauville Cycles, Burgeatine Liqueur, and the Hippodrome of Saint-Ponchon, among others.

As an illustrator, he sometimes collaborated with his brother Léon in Gil Blas or the satirical weekly Le Courrier français, among others.  The first poster exhibition in France occurred in 1884 in the Passage Vivienne in Paris and included American as well as French posters with specific representation of the work of Cheret and the two Choubrac brothers. The New York Grolier Club in November 1890 organised an exhibition of prints of the "masters in the newest art", that of bill posting, including Choubrac, Chéret, Willette and Eugène Grasset.

Legacy and death
The poster  collector Ernest Maindron, who wrote the first essay about the illustrated poster in the Gazette des Beaux-Arts in 1884, and later published the first book on the subject (Les Affiches Illustrees) in 1886, mentioned the Choubrac brothers and Chéret among the pioneers of the illustrated poster. Maindron praised Choubrac's bold line, sense of composition and highly decorative skills. According to Maindron, in his subsequent book Les Affiches Illustrees (1886–1895) published in 1896, Choubrac must have drawn more than four hundred posters for theatres, novels and industry products, before he switched his attention to the design of theatrical costumes, in which he was equally successful.

Alfred Choubrac died on 25 July 1902 from a cold gone bad.

Selected works

References

Sources
  Beraldi, Henri (1886). Les graveurs du 19e siècle; guide de l'amateur d'estampes modernes, Paris: L. Conquet
 Hiatt, Charles (1896). Picture Posters, London/New York: George Bell & Sons, MacMillan & Co.
  Maindron, Ernest (1896). Les affiches Illustrées (1886-1895), Paris: G. Boudet
  Martin, Jules (1897). Nos peintres et sculpteurs, graveurs, dessinateurs, Paris: E. Flammarion
  Rapazzini, Francesco (2016). Le Moulin Rouge en folies, Paris: Cherche Midi, 
 Verhagen, Marcus, The poster in Fin-de-Siècle Paris: "That Mobile and Degenerate Art", in: Charney, Leo & Vanessa R. Schwartz (eds.) (1995). Cinema and the Invention of Modern Life, Berkeley (CA): University of California Press,

External links
  Alfred Choubrac (1853-1902), BnF Data

1853 births
1902 deaths
19th-century French painters
French male painters
French illustrators
French draughtsmen
French poster artists
19th-century French male artists
Belle Époque